Bohnert is a German-language surname. Notable people with this name include: 

Florian Bohnert (b. 1997), Luxembourg footballer
Gertrude Bohnert (1908–1948), Swiss painter
Jean-François Bohnert, French magistrate

References

German-language surnames